This page lists the winners and nominees for the Soul Train Music Award for Best R&B/Soul Single – Female. The award was given out every year since the first annual Soul Train Music Awards in 1987. From 1989-1992 the award was known as R&B/Urban Contemporary Single – Female. When the Soul Train Music Awards returned in 2009 the categories of Best R&B/Soul Single – Female and Best R&B/Soul Album – Female were consolidated into the Best R&B/Soul Female Artist category. Anita Baker has won the most awards in this category, with a total of three wins.

Winners and nominees
Winners are listed first and highlighted in bold.

1980s

1990s

2000s

See also

 List of music awards honoring women

References

Soul Train Music Awards
Music awards honoring women